Hurley may refer to:

Places

United Kingdom
 Hurley, Berkshire
 Hurley, Warwickshire
 Hurley Common, Warwickshire

United States
 Hurley, Alabama
 Hurley, Mississippi
 Hurley, Missouri
 Hurley, New Mexico
 Hurley, New York, a town in Ulster County, New York, United States.
 Hurley (CDP), New York, a hamlet and census-designated place in the town of Hurley
 Hurley Historic District, a National Historic Landmark in the hamlet of Hurley
 Hurley, South Dakota
 Hurley, Wisconsin
 Hurley, Virginia

Sport 
 Hurley (stick), a wooden stick used in the Irish sport of hurling
 Hurley Lock, freestyle kayaking capital of south-east England, on the River Thames

People
 Hurley (surname)
 David Hurley (born 1953), Australian Governor-General
 Hurley Goodall (1927-2021), American politician
 Hurley Tarver (born 1975), American football player
 O'Hurley
 Abu Baker Asvat, a South African medical doctor and activist, nicknamed Hurley

Fictional characters 
 Bob "Bull" Hurley, an arm-wrestler from Sylvester Stallone's film Over the Top
 Big Ed Hurley, a character in the television series Twin Peaks
 Herlock "Hurley" Sholmes, a character in the video game series The Great Ace Attorney Chronicles
 Hugo "Hurley" Reyes, a character in the television series Lost
 James Hurley (Twin Peaks), a character in the television series Twin Peaks
 Nadine Hurley, a character in the television series Twin Peaks

Music
 Hurley (album), an album by Weezer

Commercial brands 
 Hurley International, a clothing brand

See also 
 Hurl (disambiguation)
 Hurling
 Hurler (disambiguation)
 Hurlingham (disambiguation)